Usnea strigosa, commonly known as bushy beard lichen, is a fruticose lichen in the family Parmeliaceae.

Distribution
Usnea strigosa has worldwide distribution.  It is a common tree lichen in Eastern and Southeastern North America.

Description
This lichen is fruticose with 2 to 5 cm long branches and abundant terminal apothecia about 5 mm wide.

Taxonomy
Usnea strigosa has three recognized subspecies, major,  rubiginea, and strigosa.  There are also several chemotypes, bringing the current taxonomy into doubt.

Ecology
Usnea strigosa grows on trees.  The most frequent hosts of this lichen are oak trees.  The photosynthetic symbionts of Usnea species are Chlorophyta green algae.

References

strigosa
Lichen species
Lichens described in 1803
Lichens of Europe
Lichens of North America
Taxa named by Erik Acharius